Brundle is a surname. Notable persons with that name include:

People
Alex Brundle (born 1990), British racing driver
Fred Brundle, namesake of the Orangeville/Brundle Field Aerodrome
James Brundle (born 1986), British motorcycle speedway racer
Martin Brundle (born 1959), British racing driver
Mitch Brundle (born 1994), British semi-professional footballer
Robin Brundle (born 1962), British auto racing driver and businessman

Characters
BrundleFly, fictional character from the 1986 David Cronenberg film The Fly
Martin Brundle (The Fly), fictional character from the 1989 film The Fly II
Seth Brundle, fictional character in the 1986 remake of the film The Fly

See also